In Euclidean geometry, Kosnita's theorem is a property of certain circles associated with an arbitrary triangle.

This result was established by the Romanian mathematician Cezar Coşniţă (1910-1962).

Their point of concurrence is known as the triangle's Kosnita point (named by Rigby in 1997).  It is the isogonal conjugate of the nine-point center. It is triangle center  in Clark Kimberling's list. This theorem is a special case of Dao's theorem on six circumcenters associated with a cyclic hexagon in.

References 

Theorems about triangles and circles